
Sir Francis Verner Wylie  (9 August 1891 – 1970) was an Indian Civil Servant.

Francis Wylie was educated in Ireland at the Royal School, Dungannon, in County Tyrone, Ulster, and at Trinity College, Dublin. He entered the Indian Civil Service (ICS) in 1914. In 1915, he arrived in India and was on military duty from 1916–19. During 1919–38 he served in the Indian Political Service and was appointed Prime Minister of Alwar State during 1933-38 and later as Governor of Central Provinces and Berar during 1938–40. He was Political Adviser to the Crown Representative during 1940–41 and 1943–45. In 1941, Wylie succeeded Sir William Fraser-Tytler as British minister in Kabul, Afghanistan. From 1945–47 he was Governor of the United Provinces.

In 1948, Wylie was appointed the British Government Director of the Suez Canal Company. In this capacity, he wrote several reports for the Suez Canal Company to the British Government.

Francis Wylie had a wife called Kathleen.

Titles
 1891–1929: Francis Verner Wylie
 1929–1938: Francis Verner Wylie, CIE
 1938–1947: Sir Francis Verner Wylie, KCSI, CIE
 1947–1952: Sir Francis Verner Wylie, GCIE, KCSI

See also
 List of Governors of the Central Provinces and Berar
 Timeline of Afghanistan (1941)

References

External links
 Pictures in the National Portrait Gallery, London

1891 births
1970 deaths
People from County Tyrone
Alumni of Trinity College Dublin
Indian Civil Service (British India) officers
Knights Commander of the Order of the Star of India
Knights Grand Commander of the Order of the Indian Empire
People educated at the Royal School Dungannon
Prime Ministers of British India
Indian Political Service officers